Sodium ozonide (NaO3) is an oxygen-rich compound of sodium. As an ozonide, it contains the ozonide anion (O3−).

Some experiments report creating sodium ozonide by applying ozone to sodium hydroxide, but the substance was not pure, and the claimed stability at room temperature was contradicted by other reports. This is in contrast to potassium ozonide, rubidium ozonide, and caesium ozonide, which can be synthesized applying ozone directly to the metal. Instead, it is made in ammonia solution using ion exchange and cryptands.

The compound is unstable at room temperature and decomposes at -10 °C to sodium superoxide and oxygen.

2NaO3 -> 2NaO2 + O2

However, the compound can be stored for months at -18 °C.

References

Sodium compounds
Ozonides